The Gata or Gata waka is a war club from Fiji.

Uses in Fiji
Usually cut from hardwood, it has a snake or rifle shaped head. The word gata means snake in Fijian language. This weapon can be used for war but also for traditional dances and ceremonies. Its shape is very similar to the kiakavo used for dancing.

Gallery

Bibliography
 John Charles Edler, Terence Barrow, Art of Polynesia, Hemmeter Publishing Corporation, 1990.
 Rod Ewins, Fijian Artefacts: The Tasmanian Museum and Art Gallery Collection, Tasmanian Museum and Art Gallery, 1982.
 Bulletin of the Fiji Museum, Numeros 1–2, Fiji Museum, 1973.

References

See also
 Totokia
 Ula 
 Sali
 Culacula
 Bulibuli

 
Throwing clubs
Clubs (weapon)
Primitive weapons
Ritual weapons
Fijian culture